Hanging Rock, also known as Bear's Paw (Yonah‑wayah in Cherokee), is a mountain in the North Carolina High Country, next to the town of Seven Devils.  It is along the Avery and Watauga border.  Its elevation reaches .  The mountain generates feeder streams for the Elk and Watauga rivers.

In 2008, Bear Paw State Natural Area was established on the mountain by the North Carolina General Assembly.  The High Country Conservancy acquired the initial  for the state, and the park now encompasses .   The natural area is located just north of Grandfather Mountain State Park, and it protects Hanging Rock Ridge and the headwaters of Dutch Creek.  It is managed by Grandfather Mountain State Park.

See also
List of mountains in North Carolina

References

External links
 Bear Paw SNA Map by the Town of Seven Devils.

Mountains of North Carolina
State parks of North Carolina
State parks of the Appalachians
Mountains of Avery County, North Carolina
Mountains of Watauga County, North Carolina
Protected areas of Avery County, North Carolina
Protected areas of Watauga County, North Carolina
Nature reserves in North Carolina